"Thanks to You" is a 1982 song by the American band Sinnamon.

It may also refer to:

 "Thanks to You", a song by Jesse Winchester from the 1988 album Humour Me; also recorded by Emmylou Harris on the 1993 album Cowgirl's Prayer
 "Thanks to You", a song by Marty Stuart from the 1996 album ''Honky Tonkin's What I Do Best